Michel Belliard (born 14 July 1949) is a French boxer. He competed in the men's light middleweight event at the 1972 Summer Olympics.

References

1949 births
Living people
French male boxers
Olympic boxers of France
Boxers at the 1972 Summer Olympics
Place of birth missing (living people)
Light-middleweight boxers